Kaita is a local government area in Katsina State, Nigeria, sharing a border in the north with the Republic of Niger. Its headquarters are in the town of Kaita.

Its current Transitions Committee Chairman, Engineer Bello Lawal Yandaki, has been running the affairs of the local government since his inauguration along with other 33 transitions committee chairmen of the 34 local government areas of the state in August 2018 by Katsina state governor Alhaji Aminu Bello Masari.

Villages in Kaita 

There are many villages under Kaita that are traditionally headed by District Heads or Magaddai as they are called in Hausa. The villages serve as wards and so produce the local government councillors. Prominent among these villages include Dankama, Girka, Dutsen Safe, Yandaki and Yanhoho.

Population 

It has an area of 925 km and a population of 184,401 at the 2006 census.

The postal code of the area is 820.

References

Local Government Areas in Katsina State